Fevicol is an Indian brand of adhesives owned by the Indian company Pidilite Industries Limited.

History 
First marketed in India in 1959, the brand was launched as an easy-to-use glue for carpenters. It was a replacement for collagen and fat-based adhesives (colloquially known as "saresh") that required melting before application. Buyers included an extensive range of consumers, craftsmen, and engineers. The company offered multiple different industrial adhesives under the label. Today, Fevicol is marketed in 54 countries, including more than 50,000 locations in India.

Product descriptions 
Fevicol branded glue is a white adhesive (the company brochures mention poly-synthetic resin). It appears as white glue (liquid). It is synthesized by heating formaldehyde and urea together.

The company makes several variants of the product designed for attributes like bonding strength, impact resistance, time to set, sagging, shrinkage, versatility, fire resistance, shock and vibration resistance, Non-staining etc.

"Fevicol MR" is used for bonding paper, cardboard, thermocol, fabrics, wood, and plywood.

"Fevicol SH" is a synthetic resin adhesive intended for wood working and various materials where one of the surfaces to be bonded is porous. SH strongly binds wood, plywood, laminate, veneers, MDF, and all types of boards and cork; it is also employed in the manufacture of sporting goods and bookbinding. SH achieves handling strength in 8 to 10 hours, fully curing in 24.

The word Fevicol is used in a generic sense by consumers in India to mean white glue. Fevicol, the largest selling brand of adhesives in India, has added another feather in its cap with the rollout of ‘Fevicol SH Xtra’. Fevicol SH Xtra is an improved, new generation variant of Fevicol SH, the flagship brand under Pidilite industries.

Initiatives 
Fevicol Design Ideas started in 1991 as Fevicol Furniture Book, with an idea of showcasing concepts of furniture designs suitable for Indian homes. The books are part of a series of 31 volumes, each one focusing on a specific topic. They range from living rooms, bedrooms, children rooms, kitchens to commercial spaces, offices, showrooms, restaurants, farmhouses, bungalows, and many more. There are even specialized books on modern and interesting designs for doors, baths, sofa sets, LCD units, tables, dining, and office chairs.

Fevicol Design Ideas has seen more than 10 million in print. Recently they have launched Fevicol Design Ideas online, users can search for contractors and interior designers on the website.

In popular culture 
In India, "Fevicol" is commonly used as a metaphor for strong bonding or stubborn stickiness, with numerous instances in Bollywood movies, topical jokes, and mundane conversation. "Fevicol Se" was the title of a song from the film Dabangg 2.

Catchy phrases from Fevicol TV ads include "Dum Laga Kar haisya, zor laga kar haisya"; "Fevicol ka mazboot jodh hai, tootega nahi".

References

External links

Fevicol Design Ideas

Adhesives
Indian brands